Olga Smeshlivaya (born October 4, 1990), known as Olya Smeshlivaya, is a Russian professional snowboarder, who specializes in the disciplines of Big Air, Slopestyle and Half-Pipe. She is multiple Champion of Russia and 3rd place on the European Cup 2013. She was member of the Russian national team and nominated for the Olympic Winter Games in Sochi, Russia. In 2010, she was honoured with the title Master of Sports of Russia. In 2015 and 2016 she was part of Nine Queens event.

Early life and professional career 
Olya was born in Crimea and moved to Moscow later. In young age she was doing professional ballroom and Latino-American sport dancing. She competed on a national level and won several competitions.

At the age of 13, she tried snowboarding for the first time. During the next years, Smeshlivaya spent her weekends on a small slope in Moscow city, where a coach noticed her. Soon she started competing in the disciplines slalom and freestyle. She won several competitions and was already focusing on freestyle more and more. At the age of 16, Smeshlivaya was invited to the Russian national team. She won several national and international competitions. 

In 2009 Smeshlivaya got Russian Champion and won the Russian Cup for the first time. She was nominated for the Olympic Winter Games in Sochi, Russia. In 2010 she was honoured with the title Master of Sports of Russia.

In 2014 Smeshlivaya injured her knee. She decided to focus less on competitions, but more on her social media and different actions sports, which she is documenting in her lifestyle vlogs from remote places around the world and posting on YouTube and Instagram.

Media and business ventures 
TV and several magazines described Smeshlivaya as "adrenaline beauty". Her visual appearance in combination with her passion for extreme sports were often mentioned in media.

The major brands brand from snowboard industry chose Smeshlivaya as brand ambassador. Smeshlivaya participated in movies like "The Search", "Miles of Smiles", "From Russia With Love"  and many other. Smeshlivaya was ambassador of Russia's ski-resort Roza Khutor in Sochi.

References

External links 
Official Website of Olya Smeshlivaya

Russian female snowboarders
1990 births
Living people